Matthew Ramsden (born 23 July 1997) is an Australian track and field athlete who specializes in middle-distance running. He won a gold medal in 1500 metres at the 2019 Oceania Athletics Championships in Townsville. He represented Australia at the 2019 World Athletics Championships, competing in men's 1500 metres.

Ramsden is currently studying a Bachelor of Commerce/Law at Deakin University.

References

External links

Australian male middle-distance runners
1997 births
Living people
World Athletics Championships athletes for Australia
Australian Athletics Championships winners
20th-century Australian people
21st-century Australian people